Urubu is the ninth album by Antônio Carlos Jobim.

Track listing
 "Bôto (Porpoise)" (Antônio Carlos Jobim, Jararaca) – 6:07
 "Ligia" – 4:13
 "Correnteza" (Antônio Carlos Jobim, Luiz Bonfá) – 2:41
 "Angela" – 2:50
 "Saudade do Brasil" – 7:27
 "Valse" (Paulo Jobim) – 3:14
 "Arquitetura de Morar (Architecture to Live)" – 8:08
 "O Homem (Man)" – 2:31

All songs composed by Antônio Carlos Jobim, except where indicated.  The album was arranged/conducted/produced by Claus Ogerman.

Personnel

 Antônio Carlos Jobim – piano, electric piano, guitar, vocals
 Ron Carter – double bass
 João Palma – drums
 Miucha - vocals on song #1 "Bôto"
 Claus Ogerman – arranger/conductor/producer

References

1976 albums
Antônio Carlos Jobim albums
Bossa nova albums
Albums arranged by Claus Ogerman
Warner Records albums